Emil Cosmin Dică (born 17 July 1982 in Scornicești) is a Romanian former footballer who played as a defensive midfielder.

He played before at Argeș Pitești, Dacia Mioveni, Rapid București, CFR Cluj, CS Mioveni, and Ceahlăul Piatra Neamț, as well as abroad, at Skoda Xanthi, in Greece, and FC Astana, in Kazakhstan.

Career
In February 2012, Dică signed for FC Astana in the Kazakhstan Premier League.

Honours

Player
Rapid București
Romanian Cup: 2005–06, 2006–07
Romanian Supercup: 2007
CFR Cluj
Liga I: 2009–10
Romanian Cup: 2009–10
Romanian Supercup: 2009, 2010

References

External links
 
 

1982 births
Living people
People from Scornicești
Romanian footballers
Association football midfielders
Liga I players
Liga II players
Super League Greece players
FC Rapid București players
FC Argeș Pitești players
CS Pandurii Târgu Jiu players
CS Mioveni players
CFR Cluj players
Xanthi F.C. players
FC Astana players
CSM Ceahlăul Piatra Neamț players
ASC Oțelul Galați players
CS Minaur Baia Mare (football) players
ASA 2013 Târgu Mureș players
CS Național Sebiș players
Romanian expatriate footballers
Expatriate footballers in Greece
Expatriate footballers in Kazakhstan
Romanian expatriate sportspeople in Greece
Romanian expatriate sportspeople in Kazakhstan
Romanian football managers